John Barrow Island is a member of the Queen Elizabeth Islands and the Arctic Archipelago in the territory of Nunavut. 
It is an elongated island located midway in the Penny Strait between Bathurst Island and Devon Island.

It is named in honour of Sir John Barrow, 1st Baronet, Permanent Secretary to British prime minister Lord (Charles Grey, 2nd Earl Grey).

References

External links
 John Barrow Island in the Atlas of Canada - Toporama; Natural Resources Canada

Islands of the Queen Elizabeth Islands
Uninhabited islands of Qikiqtaaluk Region
Islands of Baffin Bay